Chiconquiaco is a municipality in Veracruz, Mexico. It is located in the Sierra de Chiconquiaco in the middle of the State of Veracruz. It has a surface of 68.27 km2.

The municipality of  Chiconquiaco  is delimited to the north-west by Misantla, to the north by Yecuatla, to the east by Juchique de Ferrer, to the south-east by Tepetlán, to the south by Acatlán and to the west by Landero y Coss.

It produces principally maize, beans and coffee.

In Chiconquiaco, in June takes place the celebration in honor to San Pedro and San Pablo Patrons  of the place.

Climate
According to the Köppen climate classification system, Chiconquiaco has a subtropical highland climate (Cfb). Fog occurs on an average of 120.6 days per year, while lightning occurs on 3.6 days.

References

External links 

  Municipal Official webpage
  Municipal Official Information

Municipalities of Veracruz